Moody is an unincorporated community in Jasper County, Indiana, in the United States.

History
Moody was founded in 1893 by Granville Moody, and named for him. The Moody post office closed in 1923.

References

Unincorporated communities in Jasper County, Indiana
Unincorporated communities in Indiana